Lucumí or Lukumí may refer to:
Lucumí language, a lexicon of words and phrases used as the liturgical language of Santería in Cuba
Lucumí people, an Afro-Cuban ethnic group of Yoruba ancestry
Lucumí religion, another name for the Santería faith
Church of Lukumi Babalu Aye, Hialeah, Florida, United States
Church of the Lukumi Babalu Aye v. City of Hialeah, a U.S. Supreme Court case

People
Brayan Lucumí (b. 1994), Colombian footballer
Carlota Lucumí (d. 1844), Afro-Cuban slave and rebel leader
Édison Hipólito Chará Lucumí (1980 – 2011), Colombian footballer
Janer Guaza Lucumí (b. 1991), Colombian footballer
Jeison Lucumí (b. 1995), Colombian footballer
Jhon Lucumí (b. 1998), Colombian footballer
Luis Sinisterra Lucumí (b. 1999), Colombian footballer
Remigio Lucumí (1811/1816 – 1905), Afro-Cuban babalawo (Yoruba priest)
Sebastián Rincón Lucumí (b. 1994), Colombian footballer

See also 
 Loukoumi

Language and nationality disambiguation pages